Gachin may refer to:
 Gachin-e Bala, Hormozgan Province
 Gachin-e Pain, Hormozgan Province
 Gachin, Kerman, a city in Kerman Province
 Gachin, Arzuiyeh, a village in Kerman Province
 Gachin Rural District, in Hormozgan Province